Twin Peaks Music: Season Two Music and More was released by Absurda and David Lynch on October 30, 2007. It compiles the original music from season two of the drama series Twin Peaks, created by Lynch.

Track listing

Personnel 
Credits adapted from the liner notes of Twin Peaks Music: Season Two Music and More.

Performance

 Andy Armer - keyboard 
 Angelo Badalamenti - piano ; keyboard, synthesizer 
 Vinnie Bell - electric guitar 
 Lara Flynn Boyle - vocals 
 Ron Carter - bass 
 David Cooper - vibraphone 
 Eddie Daniels - clarinet 
 Eddie Dixon - electric guitar 
 Don Falzone - bass 
 Steven Hodges - drums 
 Jay Hoggard - vibraphone 
 David Jaurequi - electric guitar 
 Kinny Landrum - keyboard, synthesizer 
 Sheryl Lee - vocals 
 David Lynch - vocals 
 Albert Regni - clarinet 
 Grady Tate - drums 
 Buster Williams - bass 
 Alicia Witt - piano 

Technical

 Angelo Badalamenti - production, executive production ; arrangement 
 Tom Baker - mastering 
 Daniel Coe - assistant to Badalamenti
 Dean Hurley - digital assembly, additional mixing 
 Peter Iovino - photography
 David Lynch - production, executive production, additional mixing ; art direction, design
 Art Pohlemus - mixing 
 Dean Tokuno - photography
 Kimberly Wright - photography

References 

2007 soundtrack albums
Albums produced by Angelo Badalamenti
Albums produced by David Lynch
Twin Peaks
Music of Twin Peaks
Angelo Badalamenti soundtracks